The Songs All Sound the Same is a singles collection by American rock and roll band Supersuckers. It was originally released in 1992 on eMpTy Records. This album led ultimately to the signing of the band with Sub Pop. It was remastered and released on the Mid-Fi label with three bonus tracks, new artwork, and liner notes by Eddie Spaghetti in 2001.

Track listing
Note, tracks marked "bonus" only appear on the 2001 Mid-Fi re-release.
"Alright"
"Saddletramp"
"Poor"
"Burnin' Up"
"Gravity Bill"
"Sex & Outrage"
"What is Love"
"Junk"
"4-Stroke"
"Girl I Know"
"Luck" (bonus) 	
"I Say Fuck" (bonus) 	
"Second Cousin" (bonus)
"Razzmanazz"

Notes
"Burnin' Up" is a cover of a song by Madonna.
"Sex & Outrage" is a cover of a song by Motörhead.
"What Love Is" is a cover of a song by Dead Boys.
"Second Cousin" is a cover of a song by Flamin' Groovies.
"Razzmanazz" is a cover of a song by Nazareth.

Supersuckers albums
1992 compilation albums